The Purdue Boilermakers baseball team was a baseball team that represented Purdue University in the 2022 NCAA Division I baseball season. The Boilermakers were members of the Big Ten Conference and played their home games at Alexander Field in West Lafayette, Indiana. They were led by third-year head coach Greg Goff.

On February 26, 2022, concluding series sweeps against Princeton and South Dakota State, the Boilermakers opened 8-0, their best start since 1909.

Previous season
The Boilermakers finished the 2021 NCAA Division I baseball season 16–26 overall (16–26 conference) and eleventh place in the conference standings, as the season was limited to only conference games for all Big Ten teams due to the COVID-19 pandemic. Following the season, assistant coach Cooper Fouts left the Boilermakers for an assistant coaching position with Louisiana Tech. On July 29, 2021, Purdue hired Terry Rooney was hired to replace Fouts.

Roster

Schedule

! style="" | Regular Season
|- valign="top"

|- align="center" bgcolor="#ccffcc"
| 1 || February 18 || vs  || Constellation Field • Sugar Land, Texas || 5–4 || Weins (1–0) || Goble (0–1) || Lohman (1) || 250 || 1–0 || –
|- align="center" bgcolor="#ccffcc"
| 2 || February 19 || vs South Dakota State || Constellation Field • Sugar Land, Texas || 11–1 || Smeltz (1–0) || Carlson (0–1) || Castro (1) || 350 || 2–0 || –
|- align="center" bgcolor="#ccffcc"
| 3 || February 19 || vs South Dakota State || Constellation Field • Sugar Land, Texas || 14–3 || Wansing (1–0) || Bishop (0–1) ||None || 350 || 3–0 || –
|- align="center" bgcolor="#ccffcc"
| 4 || February 20 || vs South Dakota State || Constellation Field • Sugar Land, Texas || 10–7 || Wade (1–0) || Beazley (0–1) || Hildebrand (1) || 288 || 4–0 || –
|- align="center" bgcolor="#ccffcc"
| 5 || February 25 || vs  || Ting Stadium • Holly Springs, North Carolina || 9–3 || Smeltz (2–0) || Emus (0–1) || None || 255 || 5–0 || –
|- align="center" bgcolor="#ccffcc"
| 6 || February 25 || vs Princeton || Ting Stadium • Holly Springs, North Carolina || 8–3 || Wendell (1–0) || Rabin (0–1) || None || 436 || 6–0 || –
|- align="center" bgcolor="#ccffcc"
| 7 || February 26 || vs Princeton || Ting Stadium • Holly Springs, North Carolina || 4–3 || Hildebrand (1–0) || Hoefer (0–1) || None || 508 || 7–0 || –
|- align="center" bgcolor="#ccffcc"
| 8 || February 26 || vs Princeton || Ting Stadium • Holly Springs, North Carolina || 5–4 || Stephen (1–0) || Scannell (0–1) || None || 240 || 8–0 || –
|-

|- align="center" bgcolor="#ccffcc"
| 9 || March 2 || at Charlotte || Robert and Mariam Hayes Stadium • Charlotte, North Carolina || 6–2 || Wendell (2–0) || Thompson (0–1) || Stephen (1) || 655 || 9–0 || –
|- align="center" bgcolor="#ccffcc"
| 10 || March 4 || vs  || Ting Stadium • Holly Springs, North Carolina || 6–1 || Smeltz (3–0) || Potojecki (1–1) || None || 271 || 10–0 || –
|- align="center" bgcolor="#ccffcc"
| 11 || March 5 || vs Longwood || Ting Stadium • Holly Springs, North Carolina || 6–5 || Castro (1–0) || Karlinchak (0–1) || None || 611 || 11–0 || –
|- align="center" bgcolor="#ccffcc"
| 12 || March 6 || vs Longwood || Ting Stadium • Holly Springs, North Carolina || 6–5 || Stephen (1–0) || Parrish (0–1) || None || 703 || 12–0 || –
|- align="center" bgcolor="#ccffcc"
| 13 || March 10 ||  || Alexander Field • West Lafayette, Indiana || 8–4 || Smetlz (4–0) || Pender (0–3) || Weins (1) || 1,135 || 13–0 || –
|- align="center" bgcolor="#bbbbbb"
|  || March 12 || Bellarmine || Alexander Field • West Lafayette, Indiana ||colspan=12| Game cancelled
|- align="center" bgcolor="#ccffcc"
| 14 || March 13 || Bellarmine || Alexander Field • West Lafayette, Indiana || 7–4 || Backer (1–0) || Braunecker (0–3) || Stephen (2) || 1,087 || 14–0 || –
|- align="center" bgcolor="#ccffcc"
| 15 || March 15 || Dayton || Alexander Field • West Lafayette, Indiana || 11–2 || Wansing (2–0) || Hattrup (1–1) || None || 1,165 || 15–0 || –
|- align="center" bgcolor="#ffcccc"
| 16 || March 17 || at  || Duffy Bass Field • Normal, Illinois || 3–4 || Mabee (2–0) || Stephen (2–1) || None || 727 || 15–1 || –
|- align="center" bgcolor="#bbbbbb"
|  || March 18 || at Illinois State || Duffy Bass Field • Normal, Illinois ||colspan=12| Game cancelled
|- align="center" bgcolor="#ccffcc"
| 17 || March 20 || Illinois State || Alexander Field • West Lafayette, Indiana || 9–2 || Wansing (3–0) || Foy (0–1) || None || 1,594 || 16–1 || –
|- align="center" bgcolor="#ccffcc"
| 18 || March 20 || Illinois State || Alexander Field • West Lafayette, Indiana || 7–6 || Danzeisen (1–0) || Kubiatowicz (0–1) || None || 1,594 || 17–1 || –
|- align="center" bgcolor="#bbbbbb"
|  || March 22 ||  || Alexander Field • West Lafayette, Indiana ||colspan=12| Game postponed
|- align="center" bgcolor="#ccffcc"
| 19 || March 25 ||  || Alexander Field • West Lafayette, Indiana || 7–5 || Weins (2–0) || Johnson (0–1) || None || 1,219 || 18–1 || 1–0
|- align="center" bgcolor="#bbbbbb"
|  || March 26 || Ohio State || Alexander Field • West Lafayette, Indiana ||colspan=12| Game cancelled
|- align="center" bgcolor="#bbbbbb"
|  || March 27 || Ohio State || Alexander Field • West Lafayette, Indiana ||colspan=12| Game cancelled
|- align="center" bgcolor="#ffcccc"
| 20 || March 29 ||  || Alexander Field • West Lafayette, Indiana || 9–10 || Gould (1–0) || Weins (2–1) || Zahora (1) || 1,070 || 18–2 || 1–0
|- align="center" bgcolor="#bbbbbb"
|  || March 30 || at  || Bob Warn Field at Sycamore Stadium • Terre Haute, Indiana ||colspan=12| Game cancelled
|-

|- align="center" bgcolor="#ffcccc"
| 21 || April 1 || at  || Illinois Field • Champaign, Illinois || 1–8 || Rybarczyk (1–1) || Weins (2–2) || None || 841 || 18–3 || 1–1
|- align="center" bgcolor="#ffcccc"
| 22 || April 2 || at Illinois || Illinois Field • Champaign, Illinois || 10–11 || Glassey (1–0) || Wendell (3–1) || Green (1) || 474 || 18–4 || 1–2
|- align="center" bgcolor="#ffcccc"
| 23 || April 3 || at Illinois || Illinois Field • Champaign, Illinois || 8–11 || Wenninger (1–2) || Stephen (1–2) || None || 1,529 || 18–5 || 1–3
|- align="center" bgcolor="#ccffcc"
| 24 || April 5 || Northern Illinois || Alexander Field • West Lafayette, Indiana || 17–14 || Weins (3–2) || Nowicki (0–1) || Hildebrand (2) || 1,044 || 19–5 || 1–3
|- align="center" bgcolor="#ffcccc"
| 25 || April 6 || Indiana State || Alexander Field • West Lafayette, Indiana || 6–10 || Hurth (4–1) || Stephen (2–3) || None || 1,107 || 19–6 || 1–3
|- align="center" bgcolor="#ccffcc"
| 26 || April 9 || Indiana || Alexander Field • West Lafayette, Indiana || 17–0 || Smeltz (5–0) || Perkins (2–2) || None || 1,874 || 20–6 || 2–3
|- align="center" bgcolor="#ffcccc"
| 27 || April 10 || Indiana || Alexander Field • West Lafayette, Indiana || 3–10 || Holderfield (2–1) || Wansing (2–1) || Tucker (2) || 2,367 || 20–7 || 2–4
|- align="center" bgcolor="#ccffcc"
| 28 || April 10 || Indiana || Alexander Field • West Lafayette, Indiana || 16–15 || Hildebrand (2–0) || Sharp (0–5) || Lohman (2) || 2,367 || 21–7 || 3–4
|- align="center" bgcolor="#bbbbbb"
|  || April 12 || Purdue Fort Wayne || Alexander Field • West Lafayette, Indiana ||colspan=12| Game cancelled
|- align="center" bgcolor="#ffcccc"
| 29 || April 14 || at  || Medlar Field • University Park, Pennsylvania || 7–12 || Miller (2–2) || Castro (1–1) || Shingledecker (1) || 508 || 21–8 || 3–5
|- align="center" bgcolor="#ccffcc"
| 30 || April 15 || at Penn State || Medlar Field • University Park, Pennsylvania || 11–5 || Smeltz (6–0) || Tulio (2–2) || None || 756 || 22–8 || 4–5
|- align="center" bgcolor="#ffcccc"
| 31 || April 16 || at Penn State || Medlar Field • University Park, Pennsylvania || 5–7 || Luensmann (2–2) || Wansing (2–2) || Mellott (2) || 551 || 22–9 || 4–6
|- align="center" bgcolor="#ffcccc"
| 32 || April 19 || at  || Les Miller Field at Curtis Granderson Stadium • Chicago, Illinois || 6–9 || Zack (1–1) || Hildebrand (2–1) || Shears (6) || 158 || 22–10 || 4–6
|- align="center" bgcolor="#bbbbbb"
|  || April 20 ||  || Alexander Field • West Lafayette, Indiana ||colspan=12| Game cancelled
|- align="center" bgcolor="#ffcccc"
| 33 || April 22 ||  || Alexander Field • West Lafayette, Indiana || 2–3 || Bean (7–1) || Smeltz (6–1) || Brennan (12) || 1,648 || 22–11 || 4–6
|- align="center" bgcolor="#ffcccc"
| 34 || April 23 || Belmont || Alexander Field • West Lafayette, Indiana || 1–11 || South (5–2) || Wansing (2–3) || None || 1,689 || 22–12 || 4–6
|- align="center" bgcolor="#ffcccc"
| 35 || April 24 || Belmont || Alexander Field • West Lafayette, Indiana || 6–8 || Borders (4–2) || Wendell (3–2) || Brennan (13) || 1,369 || 22–13 || 4–6
|- align="center" bgcolor="#ccffcc"
| 36 || April 26 ||  || Alexander Field • West Lafayette, Indiana || 6–5 || Wansing (3–3) || Nowak (0–2) || None || 1,464 || 23–13 || 4–6
|- align="center" bgcolor="#ccffcc"
| 37 || April 29 || Michigan || Alexander Field • West Lafayette, Indiana || 18–4 || Backer (2–0) || O'Halloran (4–3) || None || 1,881 || 24–13 || 5–6
|-

|- align="center" bgcolor="#ccffcc"
| 38 || May 1 || Michigan || Alexander Field • West Lafayette, Indiana || 12–4 || Wendell (4–2) || Weston (4–3) || Weins (2) || 2,202 || 25–13 || 6–6
|- align="center" bgcolor="#ffcccc"
| 39 || May 1 || Michigan || Alexander Field • West Lafayette, Indiana || 2–13 || Allen (6–0) || Wansing (3–4) || None || 2,202 || 25–14 || 6–7
|- align="center" bgcolor="#ffcccc"
| 40 || May 6 || at Iowa || Duane Banks Field • Iowa City, Iowa || 2–5 || Mazur (6–2) || Backer (2–1) || Buetel (3) || 826 || 25–15 || 6–8
|- align="center" bgcolor="#ccffcc"
| 41 || May 7 || at Iowa || Duane Banks Field • Iowa City, Iowa || 10–6 || Wendell (5–2) || Schultz (2–2) || None || 1,734 || 26–15 || 7–8
|- align="center" bgcolor="#ffcccc"
| 42 || May 8 || at Iowa || Duane Banks Field • Iowa City, Iowa || 1–9 || Langenberg (5–1) || Danzeisen (1–1) || None || 1,082 || 26–16 || 7–9
|- align="center" bgcolor="#ccffcc"
| 43 || May 10 ||  || Alexander Field • West Lafayette, Indiana || 11–6 || Castro (2–1) || MacCauley (3–3) || None || 1,904 || 27–16 || 7–9
|- align="center" bgcolor="#ccffcc"
| 44 || May 13 || at Northwestern || Rocky Miller Park • Evanston, Illinois || 14–8 || Stephen (3–3) || Sullivan (5–2) || None || 673 || 28–16 || 8–9
|- align="center" bgcolor="#ffcccc"
| 45 || May 14 || at Northwestern || Rocky Miller Park • Evanston, Illinois || 1–11 || Farinelli (5–5) || Wendell (5–3) || None || 609 || 28–17 || 8–10
|- align="center" bgcolor="#ccffcc"
| 46 || May 15 || at Northwestern || Rocky Miller Park • Evanston, Illinois || 7–2 || Wansing (4–4) || Comstock (0–4) || Weins (3) || 608 || 29–17 || 9–10
|- align="center" bgcolor="#ffcccc"
| 47 || May 19 || No. 15 Maryland || Alexander Field • West Lafayette, Indiana || 7–14 || Savacool (8–2) || Backer (2–2) || None || 1,690 || 29–18 || 9–11
|- align="center" bgcolor="#ffcccc"
| 48 || May 20 || No. 15 Maryland || Alexander Field • West Lafayette, Indiana || 7–18 || Dean (6–2) || Stephen (3–4) || None || 1,420 || 29–19 || 9–12
|- align="center" bgcolor="#bbbbbb"
| – || May 21 || No. 15 Maryland || Alexander Field • West Lafayette, Indiana ||colspan=12| Game cancelled
|-

|-
! style="" | Postseason
|- valign="top" 

|- align="center" bgcolor="#ffcccc"
| 49 || May 26 || vs  || Charles Schwab Field Omaha • Omaha, Nebraska || 3–10 || Stanavich (1–3) || Weins (3–3) || None || – || 29–20 || 9–12
|- align="center" bgcolor="#ffcccc"
| 50 || May 27 || vs Iowa || Charles Schwab Field Omaha • Omaha, Nebraska || 4–5 || Christophersen (1–2) || Weins (3–4) || None || – || 29–21 || 9–12
|-

Rankings

Awards

Big Ten Conference Players of the Week

Conference awards

References

Purdue
Purdue Boilermakers baseball seasons
Purdue